Martin Lodge is professor of political science and public policy at the London School of Economics (LSE). Lodge studies comparative regulatory regimes and policies, institutional analysis, and German, British and European Union public policy.

Selected publications
On different tracks: designing railway regulation in Britain and Germany. Praeger, Westport, CT., 2002.  
The politics of public service bargains: reward, competency, loyalty - and blame. Oxford University Press, Oxford, 2006. (With Christopher Hood)  
Executive politics in times of crisis. Palgrave Macmillan, Basingstoke, 2012. (Editor with Kai Wegrich)  
Political science research methods in action. Palgrave Macmillan, Basingstoke, 2013. (With Michael Bruter)

References

External links

Martin Lodge-CV

Academics of the London School of Economics
Living people
Year of birth missing (living people)
Academics of Ulster University
German political scientists